Piglet was a short-lived American, Chicago-based instrumental math rock band, formed by the former members of the band Seyarse. Their style of music is labeled such things as "math rock," "indie rock', "post rock" "experimental rock," and instrumental rock, among others. The song structures mainly focus around clean and melodic, yet heavily complicated and technical playing which contains pleasant hooks, backed by fittingly technically demanding drumming. The band broke up after releasing their debut EP, Lava Land, on the label Team AV, in 2005. In April of 2020, Lava Land was ranked #4 in a readers poll published by Fecking Bahamas of the 50 greatest math rock albums of all time.

Due to popular demand the band ran a Kick Starter campaign in 2013 to release Lava Land on vinyl.  The LP is limited to a pressing of 1,000 copies, 900 on purple vinyl and a limited run of 100 on clear vinyl.  The campaign was such a success, Piglet were able to also package and release a CDEP called "Songs" which contains live multi-track recordings of all of the band's post-"Lava Land" material.  Recorded live at the Beat Kitchen in Chicago, "Songs", is limited to 500 copies with artwork and hand printed packaging by Kyle Maj.

Bassist Ezra Sandzer-Bell went on to publish two books on esoteric music theory in 2014/15. During that period, he released a downtempo retro gaming concept album titled Materia Musica. These were followed by collaborations with Ben Rosett in 2019 and 2020. At the start of 2021, Ezra launched a music software company called AudioCipher that helps producers generate new melodic ideas by turning words into MIDI notes. 

In January 2023, after several years of musical inactivity, Matthew Parrish formed the band Denude with members of Murder in the Red Barn, Credentials, and Fuiguirnet, as well as the Dog & Pony Records label.

Members 
Asher Weisberg - guitar (six string)
Ezra Sandzer-Bell - bass (six string)
Matthew Parrish - drums, percussion

Discography 
Lava Land EP (Team AV, 2005)
early songs EP (2013)
Songs EP (2014)

References

External links
piglet
Dog & Pony Records
AudioCipher

Math rock groups
Musical groups from Chicago